Bacuzzi is an Italian surname. Notable people with the surname include:

 Joe Bacuzzi (1916–1995), English footballer and coach
 Dave Bacuzzi (1940–2020), English footballer and manager, son of Joe

Italian-language surnames